Logistics is the detailed organization of a complex operation.

Logistics may also refer to:

 Logistics (film), a 2012 Swedish film
 Logistics (musician) (born 1981), stage name of Matt Gresham, British musician

 Logistic function, a mathematical function.